Walter Abraham Jacobs (December 24, 1883July 12, 1967) was an American chemist who discovered the Gould-Jacobs reaction. Much of his career was spent at the Rockefeller Institute for Medical Research, New York City.

Further reading

References 
http://www.encyclopedia.com/doc/1G2-2830904901.html

External links

1883 births
1967 deaths
20th-century American chemists
History of genetics